The U.S. Post Office-Price Main, at 95 S. Carbon Ave. in Price, Utah, was built in 1931.  It was listed on the National Register of Historic Places in 1989.

References

Post office buildings on the National Register of Historic Places in Utah
Neoclassical architecture in Utah
Government buildings completed in 1931
Buildings and structures in Carbon County, Utah
National Register of Historic Places in Carbon County, Utah